Streptomyces purpurascens is a bacterium species from the genus of Streptomyces which has been isolated from soil. Streptomyces purpurascens produces α-l-arabinofuranosidase, isorhodomycin A, rhodomycin A and rhodomycin B.

Further reading

See also 
 List of Streptomyces species

References

External links
Type strain of Streptomyces purpurascens at BacDive -  the Bacterial Diversity Metadatabase	

purpurascens
Bacteria described in 1952